Quararibea platyphylla is a species of flowering plant in the family Malvaceae. It is found in Costa Rica and Panama. It is threatened by habitat loss.

References

platyphylla
Flora of Costa Rica
Flora of Panama
Endangered flora of North America
Taxonomy articles created by Polbot